The Confederate Monument in Crab Orchard in Lincoln County, Kentucky, near Crab Orchard, Kentucky, commemorates the fallen Confederate soldiers of nearby states.  Many of those buried here died at the Battle of Wildcat Mountain.

The soldiers buried around the monument were from Kentucky, Georgia, Tennessee, and Texas.  Twenty-one in total, they were reinterred atop the Crab Orchard Hill in 1871.

The inscriptions mention the home states of the soldiers buried around the obelisk, with the motto Constantes Esque Ad Mortem Animas Perjecere on the north side, and a lengthier passage on the south side reading "Here off duty til the last reveille, rest the Southern soldiers, few in number, who were slain in this and in adjoining counties during the War of Secession. They fell among strangers, unknown, unfriended, yet not unhonored for strangers' hands have gathered their ashes here and placed this shaft above them. That constancy, valor, sacrifice of self, though displaced in fruitless enterprise, may not be unremembered". The monument was deliberately carved to appear draped as by a curtain.

On July 17, 1997, the Confederate Monument in Crab Orchard was one of sixty-one different monuments related to the Civil War in Kentucky placed on the National Register of Historic Places, as part of the Civil War Monuments of Kentucky Multiple Property Submission.  Only the Confederate Monument in Cynthiana in Cynthiana, Kentucky has been at the same place longer, with the 32nd Indiana Monument the only other monument in Kentucky older than the two.

In June 2007 the monument was again dedicated in a ceremony that included then Kentucky Governor Ernie Fletcher, the U.S. Army, Shriners, and a parade.

References

Civil War Monuments of Kentucky MPS
National Register of Historic Places in Lincoln County, Kentucky
Confederate States of America monuments and memorials in Kentucky
Obelisks in the United States
Marble sculptures in Kentucky
1872 sculptures
1872 establishments in Kentucky